Count László Szőgyény-Marich de Magyar-Szőgyén et Szolgaegyháza (12 November 1841 – 11 June 1916) was an Austro-Hungarian diplomat of Hungarian origin who was a long serving Ambassador at Berlin.

Life 
Born in Vienna on 12 November 1841 into an old Hungarian noble family as son of László, a former judex curiae (chief justice) of Hungary.

After studies in Vienna, Baron Szőgyény-Marich entered the civil service and was elected to the Hungarian parliament in 1869 where he represented the Deák Party, then the Liberal Party. In 1883, he left the parliament to enter the Foreign Ministry of Austria-Hungary as Second Section Chief and was later promoted to First Section Chief. On 24 December 1890, he was appointed to serve as Minister besides the King of Hungary and was made a member of the Upper House.

On 24 October 1892, Emperor Franz Joseph I appointed him ambassador to Germany and he presented his credentials to the Kaiser at Berlin on 12 November. He would hold on to this position for twenty-two years, an extraordinarily long tenure even by the standards of the time. He owed his position due to his close connections, in particular Franz Joseph's protection – he had been a close confidant and friend of Crown Prince Rudolf and dealt with the latter's papers following the Mayerling incident –, and not even Count Lexa von Aehrenthal could have him replaced.

Considered shrewd and calculating but also unimaginative, he was a personal friend of the Kaiser and the most senior Habsburg ambassador. On 17 April 1910, he was elevated to the rank of a Count.

In the summer of 1914, he was still Ambassador at Berlin despite his advanced age and being partly deaf. In order to bypass him, Foreign Minister Count von Berchtold dispatched his chef de cabinet Count von Hoyos on 4 July as a special envoy to Berlin to request support from the Kaiser for the Austro-Hungarian plans for action against Serbia. Count von Hoyos arrived the following day from Vienna and reviewed the documents with Count Szőgyény-Marich before the latter met with the Kaiser at Potsdam for lunch. In the evening he cabled Count von Berchtold that he had received "full German backing" in any action that Vienna decided to take, even if "serious European complications" resulted, requesting only that it would be done speedily.

Nevertheless it was indeed Szőgyény-Marich who delivered the historically important letter from the Austro-Hungarian Emperor Franz Joseph (dated 2.July) to the German counterpart, Wilhelm II at 5.July.

The Kaiser's pledge was confirmed the following day by Chancellor von Bethmann Hollweg and Zimmermann, the Under Secretary of State. Austria-Hungary had received the so-called 'blank check' promising German support for an Austro-Hungarian attack on Serbia. Count  Szőgyény-Marich's action during this critical month has been much debated by historians, some arguing that he did not fully grasp all the intrinsic details in the conversations he entertained with German leaders, in particular that he exaggerated the German support, and that his reports to Vienna therefore were misleading.

Strained by the burdens of the July Crisis, Count Szőgyény-Marich was succeeded as Ambassador by Prince von Hohenlohe-Schillingsfürst on 4 August, his replacement having been discussed long before the advent of war but blocked by his alleged refusal to make a graceful exit.

Count Szőgyény-Marich retired to his estate in Csór where he died two years later on 11 June 1916. He had been invested as a Knight of the Order of the Golden Fleece in 1900.

Notes

References

External links
 'Ladislaus de Szögyény-Marich von Magyar-Szögyen und Szolgaegyháza', Solving Problems Through Force
'Szögyény-Marich László, gróf', Magyar Életrajzi Lexikon

1841 births
1916 deaths
Austro-Hungarian diplomats of World War I
Ambassadors of Austria-Hungary to Germany
Diplomats from Vienna
Hungarian diplomats
Hungarian nobility
Foreign ministers of Hungary
Knights of the Golden Fleece of Austria